GAC Media, LLC, doing business as Great American Media, is a Fort Worth, Texas-based media company, and owner of the U.S. cable networks Great American Family and Great American Living.

History 
The company was announced on June 7, 2021, through its acquisition of the cable networks Great American Country and Ride TV from Discovery Inc. and Ride Television Network, Inc. respectively. The company is led by private equity investor Tom Hicks, and Bill Abbott—who formerly served as CEO of Crown Media Holdings. After taking over the channels, they were rebranded as the "Great American Channels", with GAC itself being relaunched as GAC Family and taking on a conservative, family-friendly entertainment format, and Ride TV becoming GAC Living. 

GAC Family would emulate many of the programming decisions made by Abbott while running Hallmark Channel, including a focus on original television films and holiday-themed content. It also signed deals with various actors associated with Hallmark Channel productions. In April 2022, GAC Media hired Candace Cameron Bure–who had worked with Hallmark Channel since 2008–in an executive role, which would see her develop and star in original productions for its networks. During its upfronts, Abbott stated that the company planned to expand into over-the-top content ventures, with plans for a lifestyle-based ad-supported streaming channel known as "Great American Adventures", and a "fan portal".

In May 2022, GAC Media announced Great American Community, a planned service launching in September that would carry short-form programming featuring GAC talent and personalities, and feature online forums allowing users to interact with them. The service would be free and ad-supported, but GAC Media did not rule out a premium tier in the future. In July 2022, GAC Media launched Great American Adventures on Xumo, which carries lifestyle and entertainment programming oriented towards "Americana".

Later that month, GAC Media announced that it would change its trade name to Great American Media, as part of a corporate rebranding that will also see GAC Family and Living renamed Great American Family and Great American Living on August 20, 2022. GAC Media will remain the company's legal name.

Assets

Linear networks 
 Great American Family
 Great American Living

Over-the-top services 

 Great American Adventures
 Great American Community

References

External links 
 

2021 establishments in Texas
Companies based in Fort Worth, Texas
Entertainment companies of the United States